Belén (Potosí) is a village in Bolivia. In 2010 it had an estimated population of 149.

References

Populated places in Potosí Department